Germany was present at the Eurovision Song Contest 1979, held in Jerusalem.

The German national final to select their entry, Vorentscheid 1979, was held on 17 March at the Rudi-Sedlmayer-Halle in Munich, and was hosted by Carolin Reiber and Thomas Gottschalk.

Twelve songs made it to the national final, which was broadcast by Bayerischer Rundfunk to ARD broadcasters across West Germany. The winner was decided by a sampling of 500 random West Germans who were meant to symbolize a fair representation of the country's population.

The winning entry was "Dschinghis Khan," performed by Dschinghis Khan and composed by Ralph Siegel with lyrics by Bernd Meinunger.

Before Eurovision

Ein Lied für Jerusalem

At Eurovision
Dschinghis Khan performed ninth on the night of the contest, following Switzerland and preceding Israel. At the close of the voting the song had received 86 points, placing 4th in a field of 19 competing countries.

Voting

References

External links
German National Final 1979

1979
Countries in the Eurovision Song Contest 1979
Eurovision